This is a list of Women's One-Day International cricket records, that is, record team and individual performances in Women's One Day International matches.

Team records

Team wins, losses and ties

Most wins
Teams are sorted by most wins, then most matches, then by alphabetical order.

Most consecutive wins

Most consecutive defeats

Tied matches

Team scoring records

Highest innings totals

Highest aggregate runs in a single match

Greatest win margin (by runs)

Highest successful chases

Lowest innings totals

Individual records (Batting)
 indicates current player

Most career runs

Most runs in each batting position

Highest career average

Highest average in each batting position

Most career centuries

Most 50+ scores

Most career sixes

Most career fours

Most runs in a calendar year

Highest individual score

Highest individual score (progression of record)

Highest individual score (by batting position)

Most runs against each opponent

Most ducks in career

Most runs in a career without scoring a century

Individual records (Bowling)
 indicates current player

Best figures in a match

Most career wickets

Most wickets in a calendar year

Most four-wickets-in-an-innings (and over) in a career

Best career averages

Best career strike rate

Fielding records
 indicates current player

Most catches by a fielder in ODI career

Most dismissals by a wicketkeeper in ODI career

Most catches by a wicketkeeper in ODI career

Most stumpings in ODI career

Other records
 indicates current player

Most matches played

Most matches played as captain

Most matches won as a captain

Most consecutive career matches

Most player-of-the-match awards

Most player-of-the-series awards

Partnerships records

Highest overall partnership runs by a pair

Highest partnerships

Highest wicket partnerships by wicket

See also
 List of women's Test cricket records
 List of women's Twenty20 International records
 List of men's Twenty20 International records

References

Cricket records and statistics
One Day
Records